The 2018 Pittsburgh Panthers football team represented the University of Pittsburgh in the 2018 NCAA Division I FBS football season. The Panthers were led by fourth-year head coach Pat Narduzzi and played their home games at Heinz Field. They were a member of the Coastal Division of the Atlantic Coast Conference (ACC). This was Pitt's sixth season as a member of the ACC.

Previous season 
The Panthers finished the 2017 season 5–7, 3–5 in ACC play to finish in a three-way tie for fourth place in the Coastal Division.

Preseason

Award watch lists
Listed in the order that they were released

ACC media poll
The ACC media poll was released on July 24, 2018 with the Panthers predicted to finish in fifth place in the Coastal Division.

Schedule
The Panthers schedule was released on January 17, 2018.

The Cathedral of Learning, which usually lights up after every Pitt sports win, was darkened following Pitt's 54-45 victory over Duke on October 27 out of respect for the Tree of Life Synagogue shooting in nearby Squirrel Hill, which had occurred earlier that day.

Coaching staff

Roster

Game summaries

Albany

Penn State

Georgia Tech

at North Carolina

at UCF

Syracuse

at Notre Dame

Duke

at Virginia

Virginia Tech

at Wake Forest

at Miami (FL)

vs. Clemson (ACC Championship Game)

vs. Stanford (Sun Bowl)

2019 NFL draft

References

Pittsburgh
Pittsburgh Panthers football seasons
Pittsburgh Panthers football